Black Sails EP is an extended play by the American rock band AFI. It was released on April 27, 1999, through Nitro Records. Only 5,000 copies were pressed. It is a sampler of the band's fourth studio album Black Sails in the Sunset.

Background
The first three tracks can be found on the album Black Sails in the Sunset. On the full-length album, "Porphyria" is re-titled "Porphyria Cutanea Tarda" and contains a crossfade into the next track, "Exsanguination". "Who Knew?" is a B-side from the full-length album and appears on its Japanese edition. This is the first release with Jade Puget as an official member of the band.

Track listing

Personnel 
Credits adapted from liner notes.

 AFI – producer, arrangements, backing vocals
 Davey Havok - lead vocals, lyrics
 Jade Puget - lead guitar, programming, keyboard, piano, synthesizer, backing vocals
 Adam Carson - drums, percussion, backing vocals
 Hunter Burgan - bass, programming, keyboard, backing vocals
 Nick 13 - additional guitars, vocals
 Andy Earnst – engineer, mixing
 Alan Forbes – cover illustration
 Dexter Holland – additional guitar, backing vocals
 Thad LaRue – assistant engineer
 Gabe Morford – photography
 Jamie Reilly – layout

Studios
 Engineered and mixed at The Art of Ears, Hayward, CA

References

1999 EPs
AFI (band) EPs